Agonopterix bipunctifera is a moth in the family Depressariidae. It was described by Shōnen Matsumura in 1931. It is found in the Japanese islands of Honshu and Hokkaido and on the Kuriles of Russia.

The wingspan is about 13 mm. The forewings are brown, covered by a reticulated pattern of white lines. There are two black spots at the basal angle of the cell and a white line from the lower discal spot to the termen. There is also a downward-curving line from the base to the dorsum at three-fourths. The hindwings are light brown.

References

Moths described in 1931
Agonopterix
Moths of Asia